Bruška is a village located in inland Dalmatia, Croatia, northeast of Benkovac. The population is 113 (census 2011).

See also
 Bruška massacre

References

Populated places in Zadar County
Benkovac